Cornelia Sideri (29 December 1938 – 11 November 2017) was a Romanian sprint canoer who competed in the mid-1960s. She won a bronze medal in the K-2 500 m event at the 1964 Summer Olympics in Tokyo.

References

External links
 

1938 births
2017 deaths
Canoeists at the 1964 Summer Olympics
Olympic canoeists of Romania
Olympic bronze medalists for Romania
Romanian female canoeists
Olympic medalists in canoeing
Medalists at the 1964 Summer Olympics